The University of the East has produced thousands of graduates from its 60 years of existence.
The following are list of notable people associated with the University of the East, including graduates, outstanding alumni, former students, honorary graduates, administrators and professors.

Politics and governance

Law
Some under Politics and Governance

Politics

Science, Arts & Literature

Mass Media and Entertainment

Business

Sports

Notes

References
 University of the East http://www.ue.edu.ph
 University of the East Caloocan http://www.ue.edu.ph/caloocan
 University of the East Diamond Jubilee : What is Our Role?. Published by University of the East, Dawn, 2006
 60 Outstanding Alumni - UE Today, The Diamond Jubilee Awards 2006: A Celebration of Achievement, Published by University of the East, UE Today, September 2006 /  
 UE Today, Editorial http://online.ue.edu.ph/manila/uetoday/?nav=uetoday02.htm&archive=200602
 University of the East 1967 Panorama, Cezar C. David Jr, Editor In Chief, published by University of the East, Panorama, April 1967

External links
 University of the East
 University of the East - Ramon Magsaysay Memorial Medical Center
 University of the East - Caloocan Campus

People

University of the East
East